Denise Coyle (born June 22, 1953) is an American Republican Party politician who served in the New Jersey General Assembly from January 2008 to January 2012, where she represented the 16th Legislative District.

In the Assembly, Coyle served on the Financial Institutions and Insurance Committee and the Human Services Committee.

Coyle has been a member of the Somerset County Board of Chosen Freeholders from 1996 to 2007, serving as Deputy Director in 1998, 2003 and 2007 and as Director in 1999 and 2004. She served on the Branchburg Township Committee from 1992 to 1996, serving as Deputy Mayor of Branchburg in 1994, and as Mayor of Branchburg, New Jersey in 1993.

Coyle received a B.A. in History from Saint Mary's College, Notre Dame, Indiana, and was awarded a J.D. from Rutgers School of Law - Camden. Coyle is married to Dr. Dennis Coyle and has two daughters, Kathryn and Kara.
 
Coyle did not run for re-election in 2011. She was succeeded by Donna Simon.

References

External links
Assemblywoman Coyle's Legislative Website, New Jersey Legislature
New Jersey Legislature financial disclosure forms:
2009 2008 2007
Assembly Member Denise Coyle, Project Vote Smart

1953 births
Living people
Women mayors of places in New Jersey
Mayors of places in New Jersey
Saint Mary's College (Indiana) alumni
New Jersey city council members
County commissioners in New Jersey
Republican Party members of the New Jersey General Assembly
People from Branchburg, New Jersey
Politicians from Somerset County, New Jersey
Rutgers School of Law–Camden alumni
Women state legislators in New Jersey
21st-century American politicians
21st-century American women politicians
Women city councillors in New Jersey